, known professionally as Yasuha, is a Japanese singer-songwriter, tarento, record producer, and entrepreneur. Ebina's personal life has often sparked controversy and received widespread media coverage. As well as her singing career, she was also successful as a tarento, appearing in numerous Japanese television and radio programs.

Ebina was born in Taitō, Tokyo as a child of a rakugo performer Hayashiya Sanpei I and a novelist Kayoko Ebina. She established her singing career in 1981. As a singer, Ebina is best-known for "Flyday Chinatown" (1981), which peaked at number sixty-nine on the Oricon Weekly Singles Chart. She also embarked on the tarento career, appearing in the Japanese variety television program Gogo wa MaruMaru Omoikkiri TV (1987–1988) as a host. In 1988, Ebina retired from the entertainment business after her marriage with a rakugo performer Shūnpūtei Koasa.

After a messy divorce with her ex-husband, Ebina officially returned to the entertainment industry in 2007, founding a production company Iron Candle.

Early life
Yasuha Ebina was born on January 17, 1961, in Taitō, Tokyo, as the second child of a rakugo performer Hayashiya Sanpei I and a novelist Kayoko Ebina. Her grandfather, Hayashiya Shōzō VII was also a rakugo performer, as well as her two brothers, Hayashiya Shōzō IX and Hayashiya Sanpei II. Her sister, Midori Ebina is a former actress. As a child, Ebina learned classical music, however, after failing to enter college of music, she began pursuing a career as a J-pop singer instead.

Career
In 1979, Ebina began her tarento career, appearing in the numerous television and radio programs such as the Japanese television variety shows Variety Do Re Mi Fa So La Ti Do (1979–1982) and Gogo wa MaruMaru Omoikkiri TV (1987–1988).

Ebina established her singing career in 1981, releasing her debut single "Flyday Chinatown" via Polydor Records. The song was a moderate success, peaking at number sixty-nine on the Oricon Weekly Singles Chart and selling approximately 56,000 copies. As a singer, she has released seven studio albums and two compilation albums as of June 2020. She has also written few songs for other artists, including Shohjo-Tai's hit "Motto Charleston" (1986), which reached number sixteen in Japan.

In June 1988, Ebina married a rakugo performer Shūnpūtei Koasa, and subsequently retired from the entertainment industry to support Koasa as a president of his production company, Haru Haru Dō. However, in November 2007, the couple announced the divorce in the press conference at the Imperial Hotel, Tokyo, and the relaunch of Ebina's entertainment career. Ebina drew mass public attention for publishing a book about the divorce, "Kaiun Rikon", and appearing in the professional wrestling match with Yoji Anjo as a player. In November 2008, she released her first single in the last twenty-two years, "Ohisama yo Hohoende" via her own record label, Iron Candles.

Personal life

Relationships
Ebina married a rakugo performer Shūnpūtei Koasa in June 1988 and retired from the entertainment business in order to support Koasa as a wife. Ebina and Koasa announced their separation on November 12, 2007, in the press conference. The divorce drew big public attention and widespread media coverage after Ebina slurred Koasa, calling him a "blonde pig asshole", and published a book "Kaiun Rikon", in which she wrote about her divorce with Koasa.

On September 20, 2017, Ebina announced that she engaged with an Iranian businessman, Mehdi Kazempour, whom she met on Facebook. The couple called off the engagement and parted ways in April 2018.

Discography

Albums

Studio albums

Compilation albums

Singles

As a lead artist

Songwriting credits

Bibliography

Selected filmography

References

External links
 

Japanese women singer-songwriters
Japanese women pop singers
Japanese television personalities
Singers from Tokyo
1961 births
Living people
20th-century Japanese women singers
20th-century Japanese singers
21st-century Japanese women singers
21st-century Japanese singers